Amzi Bradley Farmstead is a historic home located at Hartland in Niagara County, New York.  It is a two-story cobblestone structure built in 1836 by Connecticut native Amzi Bradley, in the Greek Revival style.  It features irregularly shaped, variously colored cobbles in its construction.  It is one of approximately 47 cobblestone structures in Niagara County.

It was listed on the National Register of Historic Places in 2002.

References

Houses on the National Register of Historic Places in New York (state)
Houses completed in 1836
Greek Revival houses in New York (state)
Cobblestone architecture
Houses in Niagara County, New York
National Register of Historic Places in Niagara County, New York
1836 establishments in New York (state)